Patrick William Fitzgerald Jr. (born December 2, 1974) is the current head coach of the Northwestern University Wildcats football team. He was selected after the unexpected death of Randy Walker and announced at a press conference on July 7, 2006. He was 31 at the time, making him the youngest head football coach in the Big Ten Conference and NCAA Division I FBS by five years. Fitzgerald would go on to become the longest-tenured head coach in Northwestern football history and entering the 2022 season is the fifth longest-tenured head coach in Division I FBS.  As a linebacker for Northwestern from 1993 to 1996, he won both the Bronko Nagurski Trophy and Chuck Bednarik Award twice as the best defensive player in college football. He was awarded a Big Ten Medal of Honor in 1997 and was inducted into the College Football Hall of Fame in 2008.

Playing career
Fitzgerald starred at linebacker for the Wildcats in the mid-1990s, helping to lead the team to a 10–1 regular season record in 1995 and a berth in the 1996 Rose Bowl, the school's second ever bowl appearance and the first since 1949. Known as "Fitz" to the Northwestern faithful, he personified the Wildcats' blue-collar, opportunistic defense. He recorded eleven tackles in Northwestern's victory over then #9 Notre Dame in South Bend which was the first Wildcats' victory over the Irish since 1962. Against #7 Michigan, Fitzgerald led the defensive effort with 14 tackles (including two tackles for loss) in the Wildcats' 19–13 win, the first for Northwestern in Ann Arbor since 1959. At one point during the 1995 season he was averaging over 13 tackles a game while on his way to Consensus All-America honors. Fitzgerald was unable to play in the Rose Bowl, however, after breaking his leg in the next-to-last game of the 1995 season against Iowa. Fitzgerald returned for the 1996 season, leading the Wildcats to a 9–3 overall record, a second straight Big Ten Championship and second consecutive New Year's Day bowl, the 1997 Citrus Bowl.

In his playing career, he was twice named Big Ten Defensive Player of the Year and was a two-time Consensus All-American. Fitzgerald won both the Bronko Nagurski Trophy and the Chuck Bednarik Award in 1995 and again in 1996, becoming the first two-time winner of both honors. He also won the Jack Lambert Trophy as best linebacker in the nation in 1996. In 1997, he was awarded the Big Ten Medal of Honor, which recognizes one male and one female student from the graduating class of each Big Ten member school, for demonstrating joint athletic and academic excellence throughout their college career.

He was not drafted after his senior year, but he was signed as a free agent by the Dallas Cowboys, who released him after just two pre-season games.

Fitzgerald is the 15th Northwestern player or coach to be inducted into the College Football Hall of Fame. He was honored at a ceremony on December 9, 2008 in New York City and enshrined in the Hall of Fame in South Bend, Indiana in July 2009.

Coaching career

Early career

After graduation, he joined the coaching staff at the University of Maryland in 1998 under head coach Ron Vanderlinden, who had been Fitzgerald's defensive coordinator during his playing days at Northwestern. He then moved on to the University of Colorado under his former Northwestern head coach, Gary Barnett. He took a job at the University of Idaho before returning to Northwestern in 2001, where he served as linebackers coach and recruiting coordinator until his promotion to head coach after the unexpected death of Randy Walker in June 2006.

Northwestern head coach

2006–2012
The Wildcats struggled in Fitzgerald's first season as head coach going only 4–8 overall and 2–6 in the Big Ten.

The 'Cats improved to 6–6 the following year before going 9–3 in the 2008 regular season (5–3 in conference play) and playing in the Alamo Bowl. After the season, Fitzgerald was named the Big Ten Coach of the Year by the Touchdown Club of Columbus.

The 2009 season saw the Wildcats go into Iowa City and knock off Iowa 17–10 on November 7. The win over Iowa came when the Hawkeyes were ranked #4 in the BCS standings and is, to date, the highest ranked opponent ever defeated by a Fitzgerald coached team. Two weeks later, the Wildcats knocked off #14 Wisconsin in Evanston for the second upset win of the season. Northwestern finished off the '09 campaign with a thrilling game in the 2010 Outback Bowl that saw Wildcat quarterback Mike Kafka set not only school records with 47 completions on 78 attempts for 532 passing yards but set all-time all-bowl records in those categories as well. The Wildcats fell 38–35 in overtime to Auburn (who would win the BCS Championship the following season) when a fake field goal attempt fell short. Nearly six million viewers watched the Wildcats play in their first New Year's Day bowl since 1996 in one of the most entertaining games of the 2009–2010 bowl season.

The Wildcats' winning ways under Fitzgerald continued in 2010, highlighted by a dramatic last minute 21–17 upset of then #13 Iowa en route a third straight winning season and a third consecutive bowl game.

In 2011, the Fitzgerald-led Wildcats defeated #9 Nebraska in Lincoln 28–27 with back-up quarterback Kain Colter guiding the Wildcats in the second half.

Fitzgerald became only the second coach in school history to coach two nine-win Wildcat teams during the 2012 campaign that saw the 'Cats go 9–3 in the regular season and 5–3 in the Big Ten. Northwestern played in the third New Year's Day bowl game under Fitzgerald when the team accepted an invitation to play in the 2013 Gator Bowl. Fitzgerald then guided the Wildcats to their first bowl victory in sixty-four years when he led Northwestern to a 34–20 victory over Mississippi State in the Gator Bowl. The '12 team finished the season with a 10–3 record which tied the 1995 and 1903 teams for the most wins in school history.  The Gator Bowl win was also Fitzgerald's 50th win as head coach, allowing him to pass Pappy Waldorf as the winningest coach in Northwestern history.

2013
The 2013 campaign started with high expectations for the Wildcats and hopes of contending for a conference title. The 'Cats started the season ranked #22 in the pre-season AP poll and roared to a 4–0 start. ESPN College GameDay came to Evanston for the first time since 1995 as the #18 Wildcats took on the #4 Ohio State Buckeyes on national television. A controversial fourth down call that saw the officials rule that 'Cats quarterback Kain Colter was stopped when replays indicated Colter had made the line to gain proved pivotal in the 38–30 defeat. The season began to be marred by injuries as All-American Venric Mark and quarterback Kain Colter missed significant playing time with injuries. The Wildcats then dropped four consecutive games that could have just as easily been won. First, NU dropped a 20–17 game against Minnesota, then the 'Cats lost 17–10 to Iowa in overtime. Perhaps the most bitter loss of the season came at Nebraska when the Huskers converted a Hail Mary touchdown pass as time expired to win the game. The following week the 'Cats clung to a 9–6 lead over Michigan when the Wolverines ran their field goal team on with seconds to play; Michigan converted the field goal and won in triple overtime. Northwestern ended a disappointing season with a win however: a 37–34 victory over rival Illinois. The 2013 team finished 5–7, Fitzgerald's second losing campaign since his inaugural season as the Wildcats head coach.

2014

In 2014, the Wildcats entered the year having lost two major weapons from seasons past: All-American Venric Mark transferred and leading wide receiver Christian Jones was lost to a season-ending knee injury. The 'Cats started 0–2 with a loss to MAC power Northern Illinois before ripping off three straight wins. After back-to-back blowout losses to #19 Nebraska and Iowa the Cats had a chance to knock off Michigan at home. Late in the game, Trevor Siemian threw a touchdown pass with three seconds left to pull the 'Cats within one at 10–9. Coach Fitzgerald decided to go for the two point conversion and the win but Sieman slipped after taking the snap and was downed by the Wolverines, ending the game with another loss. The highlight of the season came the following week however when Northwestern returned to South Bend for the first time since 1995 to take on the #18 Notre Dame Fighting Irish. Siemian threw for 284 yards and freshman Justin Jackson rushed for 149 yards and a score as the 'Cats scored 10 points the final four minutes to tie the game with seconds remaining. In overtime, Northwestern held the Irish to a missed field goal try before Wildcats kicker Jack Mitchell hit his fourth field goal of the game to give the 'Cats a 43–40 overtime victory. After a lopsided win the following week against Purdue the 5–6 'Cats played Illinois for a chance to return to a bowl game. However, having lost starting QB Trevor Siemian to a season-ending injury during the Purdue game, the Wildcats came out flat in the game and the Illini raced to a 47–33 victory that kept the 'Cats home for the holidays for the second straight year.

2015
After suffering through back-to-back losing seasons for the first time in his Northwestern tenure, Fitzgerald faced an uncertain season in 2015. The team had to replace senior quarterback Trevor Siemian who was drafted in the 7th round of the 2015 NFL Draft by the Denver Broncos and turned to redshirt freshman Clayton Thorson. Sophomore running back Justin Jackson, who had burst onto the national scene with a powerful performance during NU's upset of Notre Dame in South Bend, was named the starting running back prior to the season. In the season opener, the Wildcats hosted #21 Stanford and the Cardinal were heavily favored. Thorson made his impression felt early when he dashed 42 yards for a touchdown that gave the Wildcats a lead. Jackson contributed with 134 tough yards as the Wildcat defense did the rest. Cornerback Kyle Queiro sealed the game when he intercepted Stanford quarterback Kevin Hogan in the end zone with less than a minute to play. The turnover gave the 'Cats a 16–6 win and their first win over Stanford since 1958. The Cardinal would go on to win the 2016 Rose Bowl and finish ranked #3 in the nation. The Wildcats then went on a five-game winning streak rising to #13 in the nation before getting blanked 38–0 by Michigan in Ann Arbor. The Cats then lost to Iowa the following week and a once promising season began to teeter on the brink of collapse. In a gut-check game at Lincoln the next week, the Wildcats edged Nebraska 30–28 powered by a 68-yard Clayton Thorson run and a 72-yard Nick VanHoose interception return for a touchdown. After three straight wins the 'Cats traveled to Camp Randall stadium to take on the #20 Wisconsin. The game was exceptionally close and with the Wildcats leading 13–7, the Badgers threatened late moving to the NU one yard line. Northwestern's defense held firm with a critical sack and a tremendous goal line stand to preserve the victory. The Wildcats ended the season with a strong 24–14 win over the Illini, avenging the loss of a season before. At 10–2 the Wildcats were invited to the 2016 Outback Bowl where they faced Tennessee. The 'Cats played competitively in the first half; Tennessee clung to a 10–6 lead with less than three minutes to play. But the Vols punched a touchdown in before half and the game became lopsided in the second half. The Wildcats 45–6 loss was punctuated by a 100-yard interception return for touchdown on the game's final play. Still, the 10–3 finish gave Fitzgerald his second ten win season as the Wildcats head coach and tied the '03, '95 and '12 teams as the most wins in school history. Northwestern has had four ten-win seasons in its history; Fitzgerald has been part of three of them.

2016
In 2016 the Wildcats looked to build on the success of the season before with a still very young group. But before the season the challenges began when star cornerback Keith Watkins II suffered a knee injury in August practice. Cornerback Matthew Harris, a defensive stalwart, was forced to retire after two games due to repeated concussions. The season started poorly with Northwestern blowing home games to Western Michigan and Illinois State of the FCS. Against Western Michigan, Clayton Thorson fumbled the ball going into the end zone for what would have likely been a game clinching score. While Western Michigan would go on to a 13–1 record, a MAC title and a Cotton Bowl berth, the loss stung as the Wildcats started the season 0–1. Against Illinois State, the Wildcat offense faltered and the Redbirds kicked a game-winning field goal as time expired to stun the 'Cats 9–7. Despite starting the season at 0–2, Coach Fitzgerald did not panic and neither did his young team. The Wildcats won 3 of their next four games including victories at Iowa and at Michigan State.

With the ship righted at 4–3 the Wildcats faced #6 Ohio State in Columbus. The game was tight throughout with Ohio State escaping with a 24–20 victory. At 5–6 and going into the final game of the season against Illinois the Wildcats were determined not to repeat the 2014 season and miss the chance to go to a bowl by losing to the rival Illini. In 2016, they succeeded by rolling the Illini 42–21 in a game that was more lopsided than the final score indicated.

At 6–6, the 'Cats were invited to the 2016 Pinstripe Bowl to be played at historic Yankee Stadium. In the game, the 'Cats would face the #22 ranked Pitt Panthers, a team that had given the eventual national champion Clemson Tigers their only loss on the season. Unsurprisingly, the 8–4 Panthers were a double digit favorite going into the game. The 'Cats raced out to a 14–3 lead as the defense stuffed a fourth and goal attempt by Pitt and junior running back Justin Jackson began to take the game over. The Panthers rallied and even took a 17–14 lead in the third quarter. But Jackson – who rushed for a Northwestern bowl game record 224 yards and 3 touchdowns – and the Cats wouldn't be denied and showed it as he rumbled for a 40-yard touchdown to retake the lead. The 'Cats defense stood tall. After Pitt quarterback Nathan Peterman was knocked out of the game on a sack, the Wildcats intercepted backup Ben DiNucci twice in the redzone. The turnovers preserved a 31–24 Northwestern victory which was just the third in school history. The Cats finished the season at 7–6 which was Fitzgerald's sixth winning season.

2017
Going into the 2017 the Wildcats hoped to continue the momentum earned in the Pinstripe Bowl and contend for a Big Ten championship. But early season stumbles plagued the 'Cats again. After an uneven performance against a Nevada team that would finish 3–9 the Cats traveled to Durham, North Carolina where they were blasted by Duke 41–17. The Wildcats rebounded and showed the rest of the conference how good they could be with a 49–7 drubbing of Bowling Green at home. The next two weeks, however, challenged the Cats as they began conference play. Facing #5 ranked Wisconsin Badgers the Cats took a lead at one point and, with less than two minutes to play trailed by a touchdown and had the ball. A safety ended the 'Cats' upset hopes and their chances to win a Big Ten West title: the Badgers would not lose en route to a perfect regular season. After a lopsided loss to #12 Penn State, the Wildcats season was on the brink.

At 2–3 with the heart of the Big Ten schedule ahead, the Wildcats had little margin for error. As Coach Fitzgerald later said: "We did the only thing we could do. Go to work." Go to work, the 'Cats did and they were unafraid to use extra time to do it. After ripping Maryland 37–21 on the road the 'Cats hosted the Iowa Hawkeyes. With the wind whipping at Ryan Field, Coach Fitz decided to forgo a late possession and play for overtime after the Hawkeyes tied the game a 10–10. In the overtime period, 'Cats star Justin Jackson converted a third and long on a short pass from Clayton Thorson making a fantastic individual play. The 'Cats scored on the next play to take a 17–10 lead. When Iowa got their overtime possession the 'Cats held the Hawkeyes on fourth down to secure the victory. The following week the Wildcats hosted the #16 Michigan State Spartans at Ryan Field. The 6–1 Spartans were undefeated in the Big Ten having already defeated in-state rival Michigan; the Spartans looked to contend for a Big Ten East title. But the Wildcats were determined and would not quit. The Spartans tied the game in regulation at 17–17 scoring a touchdown with :25 left on the clock. The Wildcats scored a touchdown in the first overtime frame as did the Spartans. Michigan State then scored a touchdown on their possession of the second overtime to take a 31–24 lead. But the 'Cats matched the score with a three-yard touchdown plunge from Justin Jackson. In the third overtime, Northwestern took the ball first and Flynn Nagel raced in to the end zone from 22 yards out. Quarterback Clayton Thorson then hit superback Cameron Green (who had already caught a touchdown in overtime) for a two-point conversion to give Northwestern an eight-point lead. Michigan State's quarterback Brian Lewerke had shredded the 'Cats defense already throwing for 462 yards. Lewerke tried to make a play after fumbling the snap and hurled a long pass towards the end zone. But linebacker Nate Hall – who had suffered a laceration in his hand and received thirty stitches during the game – made a game sealing interception. Northwestern was now rolling when the 'Cats traveled to Lincoln to face the Nebraska Cornhuskers. The Huskers had the 'Cats on the ropes in the second half leading 24–17 and driving late in the fourth quarter. But defensive stalwart Godwin Igwebuike made a critical interception after sack leader Joe Gaziano forced a bad pass from the Husker quarterback. Clayton Thorson led the 'Cats on a game tying drive, taking the ball in himself from seven yards out for a touchdown. In overtime, the Wildcats got the ball first and faced a fourth and goal at the one yard line. Coach Fitzgerald decided to forego a field goal, the safe play, and kept his offense on the field. Thorson plunged in for his second touchdown of the game and gave the 'Cats a 31–24 lead. On Nebraska's possession, Samduke Miller crushed the Husker quarterback with a sack forcing a fourth and long throw that was broken up by Kyle Queiro who had already had two picks on the day. Prior to 2017 and since the NCAA instituted overtime for regular season FBS games in 1995, no team had ever won three consecutive overtime games; the Northwestern Wildcats now own that piece of football history as the winner of three straight overtime games.

Northwestern was ranked in the Top 25 in the College Football Playoff rankings, the AP and the Coaches polls. The 'Cats were rolling, and dominated their next three opponents – Purdue, Minnesota and Illinois – winning their last two games by a combined score of 81–7 to finish 9–3 on the regular season and 7–2 in the Big Ten. Senior running back Justin Jackson became only the second back in Big Ten history to run for over 1,000 yards in four consecutive season. With 144 yards rushing against Illinois, Jackson ranks #4 on the all-time Big Ten career rushing leaders list with 5,283 yards. Jackson scored a touchdown against Illinois to give him 39 career touchdowns which was the all-time most in Northwestern history. Clayton Thorson became the all-time winningest quarterback at Northwestern with a record of 26–13; Thorson also is tied with Brett Basenez as NU's all-time career touchdown pass leader with 44 scoring throws. In the 2017 Music City Bowl, it was Wildcats vs. Wildcats as Northwestern faced Kentucky. The Wildcats faced an early test when quarterback Clayton Thorson went down early with an ACL tear after catching a halfback pass that would ultimately lead the Wildcats first touchdown. But backup quarterback Matt Alviti was ready and played inspired football. The 'Cats took a 17–7 lead into the half but couldn't put Kentucky away in the second half. Midway through the fourth quarter, a questionable Northwestern offensive play call on a fourth-and-goal from the Kentucky two yard line was stuffed and Kentucky took over trailing by three and with all the momentum. But two plays later, defensive star Kyle Queiro made an interception and amazingly stayed in bounds to return the ball 26 yards for a touchdown. Kentucky was not going away and with :37 left scored a touchdown to make the score 24–23. Kentucky decided to go for the two point conversion and the lead but the Northwestern defense stood tough, knocking the pass away and preserving a 24–23 win. The win was Northwestern's tenth on the season, was the third ten-win season in Fitzgerald's career and was the second in three seasons. Northwestern's win in the 2016 Pinstripe Bowl and the 2017 Music City bowl marked the first time in program history that Northwestern had won back-to-back bowl games and is the only time that has been accomplished in consecutive seasons.

2018

The 2018 season began with uncertainty and challenge. Senior quarterback Clayton Thorson was returning from off-season ACL surgery and it was unclear how much he would play in the 'Cats early season games. Additionally, the 'Cats opened on the road against a tough Purdue team that had won a bowl game the year before. Thorson got the start for Northwestern but was on a 'pitch-count' to reduce the stress on his still-healing knee. Back-up quarterback T.J. Green, son of former NFL Pro Bowl quarterback Trent Green was effective in relief of Thorson and scored a critical rushing touchdown. The Wildcats prevailed 31–27 over the Boilermakers. However the next three weeks were challenging for the Wildcats. After dropping a 21–7 loss to Duke (who would win 8 games on the season and their bowl game), the Cats built a 21–3 halftime lead against Akron at home the following week in a game that saw Clayton Thorson become NU's all-time leader in passing touchdowns. But chaos reigned as the Zips created three turnovers and scored defensive touchdowns on each of them. The Wildcats gamely fought back but lost 39–34 to the Zips. To make matters more challenging, star running back Jeremy Larkin told his teammates that he had to medically retire from football due to cervical stenosis. Despite the bad news, Northwestern fought valiantly against the #14 Michigan Wolverines jumping out to a 17–0 lead before falling 20–17. With a 1–3 record, the season was at a crossroads. With Thorson still fighting back from his injury, Larkin out with his medical retirement and the Cats record it would have been easy for the team to give up. And yet, Coach Fitzgerald and his players stayed the course and kept fighting.

The immediate challenged loomed as the 'Cats traveled to East Lansing to take on the #20 ranked Michigan State Spartans. Northwestern was up to the task. Sparked by Thorson's 77 yard touchdown pass to Kyric McGowan the Wildcats rolled to a 29–19 victory over Michigan State. The next week, Northwestern had a homecoming matchup against Nebraska and found themselves down 31–21 with 5:41 left in the game. But the Wildcats rallied. First, they scored a field goal to cut the lead to seven. Then, Thorson masterfully led an eight play, 99 yard drive that ended with a five-yard touchdown pass to freshman J.J. Jefferson with just twelve seconds to play. In overtime, Cats' back-up kicker Drew Luckenbaugh – who had not kicked a field goal since high school – kicked what proved to be the game winning 31 yard field goal as NU snuffed out the Nebraska overtime possession to win 34–31. A grind it out win at Rutgers followed the next week and announced the introduction of true freshman running back Isiah Bowser. Bowser, a star Ohio product, was originally set to be red-shirted but the retirement of Larkin pressed him in to potential service. Bowser rushed for 108 yards and 2 touchdowns and cemented himself as the Wildcats feature back. Northwestern then dominated #20 Wisconsin winning 31–17 at Ryan Field in a game far more lopsided than the final score indicated. The win was vital for Northwestern's chances to win the Big Ten West because Wisconsin had kept the Wildcats out of the Big Ten Championship Game the previous season. The following week the Notre Dame Fighting Irish came to Ryan Field for the first time since 1976. The Irish were ranked #3 and went out to a 24–7 lead in the fourth quarter before Northwestern rallied furiously behind a Thorson touchdown pass and a blocked punt that cut the score 24–21. A late Ian Book touchdown run on third down sealed the Irish win.

The following week brought uncharted territory for the Wildcats. In a frigid Iowa City, the Wildcats faced the Iowa Hawkeyes. Northwestern trailed 10–7 before Bennett Skrownek made a spectacular diving touchdown catch that gave the Wildcats a 14–10 lead. Paddy Fisher the forced a late Iowa fumble that sealed the win. Northwestern's win coupled with losses by Purdue and Wisconsin that day gave the Wildcats their first Big Ten West Division Championship. While Northwestern was locked into the Big Ten Championship Game they still had two games left on the schedule. Despite some questioning whether or not the Wildcats would show up to play – having already clinched a post-season berth – Coach Fitzgerald got his team prepared to play and win like champions. The Wildcats traveled to Minneapolis where they dispatched Minnesota by ten points and then returned to Ryan Field and beat Illinois for the fourth straight time and the sixth time in the last seven meetings.

In the 2018 Big Ten Football Championship Game the Wildcats faced the heavily favored Ohio State Buckeyes and their Heisman Trophy-candidate quarterback Dwayne Haskins. Ohio State jumped out to a 24–7 halftime lead but the Wildcats clawed back in the second half first behind an 18-yard touchdown run by Thorson and then with Thorson throwing a two-yard touchdown pass to Cameron Green. The game was a one-score affair in the fourth quarter with Ohio State holding a 31–24 lead with just ten minutes to play. But Haskins and the Buckeye offense proved too much for the Wildcat defense and two late touchdowns put the game out of reach for Northwestern.

The 2018 Northwestern season concluded with the 2018 Holiday Bowl pitting the #22 ranked Wildcats against the #17 Utah Utes, winners of the Pac-12 South Division. Utah was favored by a touchdown at kickoff and the prognosticators looked right in the first half as Northwestern fell behind 20–3. But the third quarter was a different story. On Utah's first possession of the third quarter the Wildcats forced a turnover and quickly turned it into points as Thorson threw a four-yard touchdown pass to Riley Lees. The game turned completely, however, on Utah's next possession when it appeared the Utes were headed for another score. All-Big Ten linebacker Paddy Fisher forced a fumble and senior Jared McGee returned it 82 yards for a touchdown. Utah turnovers continued and continued to turn into Wildcat points. Northwestern took the lead on a trick play where offensive lineman J.B. Butler pretended to go out for a pass in the flat but Thorson threw to reserve offensive lineman Trey Klock who had lined up as a tight end. Klock caught his one and only pass as a Northwestern Wildcat and turned it into a twenty-one yard touchdown that gave Northwestern the lead. The play was widely celebrated in bowl highlights and on social media and Thorson wryly commented: "We had to get the ball in the hands of our playmakers." After another Utah turnover, wide receiver Riley Lees scored a touchdown from the 'Wildcat' formation that proved to be the door slammer as Northwestern scored a Holiday Bowl record 28 third quarter points to go with a Holiday Bowl record six forced turnovers (2 interceptions and 4 fumbles) in a 31–20 win over Utah.

Perhaps the most important part of the game came in the post-game celebration, however. For the days leading up to the game, there were rumors in the sports world that the Green Bay Packers were interested in interviewing Coach Fitzgerald for their vacant head coaching position. At the trophy presentation after the game, Fox broadcaster Joel Klatt asked Coach Fitzgerald about the rumors. To the delight of the Wildcat faithful, Coach Fitzgerald put the rumors to bed saying: "Hashtag Go Cats man, I'm not going anywhere. I'm here forever."

Legacy
Fitzgerald's 109 overall wins and 64 Big Ten Conference wins are both school records. In thirteen seasons, Fitzgerald has coached nine winning teams and one team that finished the season at .500. Coach Fitzgerald has led the Wildcats to ten bowl games in thirteen seasons; before he became head coach the 'Cats had only been in six bowl games in 123 football seasons. From 2016 to 2018, Coach Fitzgerald has led the Wildcats to three consecutive bowl wins (2016 Pinstripe, 2017 Music City, 2018 Holiday). From 2008 to 2012, he led the Wildcats to five consecutive bowl appearances, including three of their six all-time New Year's Day bowl appearances. He is one of only two coaches in school history to lead Northwestern to a bowl game victory, is the only NU coach to win back-to-back bowl games and has the most bowl game victories in school history. Fitzgerald is only the second head coach to lead Northwestern to four consecutive winning seasons (2015–2018) and the first since Dick Hanley coached the Wildcats to winning years from 1928–1931. Fitzgerald's .567 winning percentage at NU is the highest since Dick Hanley who coached the Wildcats from 1927 to 1934. The 2014–2017 Wildcats seasons are the best – in terms of wins – since the Wildcats teams of 1903–1905. Fitzgerald is one of six coaches in the NCAA who has been at his school the longest and joins Kirk Ferentz of Iowa as the longest tenured active coaches in the Big Ten.

Coach Fitzgerald is a huge supporter of Northwestern athletics other than football. As the 2016–17 Northwestern Wildcats men's basketball team made their run to Northwestern's first ever NCAA Tournament berth, Fitzgerald often cheered on the team. When the Wildcats traveled to Salt Lake City to face Vanderbilt in the first round, Fitzgerald was seen sitting with Wildcat fans and leading the cheers during the game. After the Wildcats beat the Commodores for their first ever tourney win, Fitzgerald went to the locker room where he excitedly celebrated with the players. Before the Wildcats' second-round game against Gonzaga, Fitzgerald led the 'Cats faithful at a pep rally in Salt Lake City.

Fitzgerald does not shy away from Northwestern's status as a world class university often using it to recruit smart and talented athletes rather than using it as a reason for why the school cannot be competitive in football. One of the NU football program's mantras is: "Football is not an excuse for academics and academics is not an excuse for football."

Personal life
Fitzgerald is from Orland Park, Illinois, and resides in Northfield, Illinois with his wife, Stacy, and three sons, Jack, Ryan, and Brendan. He purchased a $2.3 million newly constructed home in January 2010. A born and bred Chicagoan, Fitzgerald is a huge fan of the area pro sports teams often using his Twitter feed to support the Bears, Blackhawks and White Sox. While Fitzgerald has led the Wrigley Field crowd in the iconic "Take Me Out to the Ballgame" song during the seventh inning stretch of a Cubs game, as a South Sider he is a die-hard White Sox fan. In April 2017, Fitzgerald signed a ten-year contract extension with Northwestern. While Northwestern is a private university and is not obligated to release compensation data, some publicly available tax forms indicate that Fitzgerald is among the highest paid coaches in the Big Ten. In further support of Fitzgerald and the football team, Northwestern has built a $260 million football facility on the lakeshore section of campus that opened in 2018.

Head coaching record

References

External links
 Northwestern profile
 

Living people
1974 births
American football linebackers
Colorado Buffaloes football coaches
Idaho Vandals football coaches
Maryland Terrapins football coaches
Northwestern Wildcats football coaches
Northwestern Wildcats football players
Northwestern University School of Education and Social Policy alumni
All-American college football players
College Football Hall of Fame inductees
People from Northfield, Illinois
People from Orland Park, Illinois
Players of American football from Illinois
Sportspeople from Cook County, Illinois